Patrick Hogan (born September 17, 1997) is an American professional soccer player who plays as a defender for Pittsburgh Riverhounds in the USL Championship.

Career

Youth
Hogan attended Charlotte Catholic High School and played club soccer as part of the USSF side Charlotte Soccer Academy. He was named to TopDrawerSoccer.com's Best XI for the 2014 USSDA Summer Showcase. At high school Hogan earned Honor Roll all four years and was as a member of Charlotte Catholic's National Honor Society.

College and amateur
Hogan played college soccer at the University of North Carolina at Charlotte between 2017 and 2020. He redshirted his freshman season and his senior season was affected by the COVID-19 pandemic. During his four seasons with the 49ers, Hogan made 64 appearances and scored 9 goals. He was named on 2021 MAC Hermann Trophy Watch List and was 2021 Conference USA Preseason Defensive Player of the Year. In his career, Hogan was a two-time first team All-Conference USA selection. In his senior year he was a first team United Soccer Coaches All-Southeast Region selection after earning second team honors last season. In 2019, he was named to the Conference USA All-Tournament team.

In 2019, Hogan also played with USL League Two side Discoveries SC.

Professional
On May 26, 2021, Hogan signed with USL Championship side Charleston Battery. He made his debut for the club on June 8, 2021, appearing as a 65th-minute substitute during a 1–0 win over Loudoun United. Following the 2022 season, Hogan was released by Charleston.

On February 15, 2023, Hogan signed a one-year deal with USL Championship side Pittsburgh Riverhounds.

References

External links
Charlotte bio
Charleston Battery bio

1997 births
American soccer players
Association football defenders
Charleston Battery players
Charlotte 49ers men's soccer players
Living people
Pittsburgh Riverhounds SC players
People from Charlotte, North Carolina
Soccer players from North Carolina
USL Championship players
USL League Two players